Corps Austria is a member Corps of the Kösener Senioren-Convents-Verband, the association of the oldest student fraternities in Germany, Austria and Switzerland. Corps Austria is "pflichtschlagend", which refers to the fact that it requires of its members to participate in several organized duel-like fencing engagements with members of other specific student fraternities, a ritual dating back to the 17th century and described by Mark Twain in his book "A tramp abroad". The Corps Austria is further considered "farbentragend" in that its members wear a colored sash (right shoulder to left waist) across their chests as evidence of their membership of the fraternity. Both of these tendencies are characteristic of the most traditional and often very elite all-male fraternities in countries for central Europe. Eligible applicants are students of the Goethe University Frankfurt and other colleges in Frankfurt, Germany. Members of Corps Austria are colloquially referred to as "Austrianer", or simply "Austern". Corps Austria was founded in 1861 at the Charles-Ferdinand University in Prague and moved to the newly established Goethe University Frankfurt in 1919.

The German student corps were traditionally recruited from the nobility and social elite, and are traditionally viewed as more elitist than other German student fraternities such as the Catholic Cartellverband and the Burschenschaften. They consider tolerance and individuality to be key tenets and are rooted in German idealism. Their general political outlook is conservative, but more cosmopolitan and less right-wing than the Burschenschaften.

Couleur

The "colours" of Corps Austria are black, white and yellow, in that exact order. Black and yellow were the colours of the flag of the Habsburg Monarchy until 1867. In addition to the aforementioned coloured sash, headgear is also worn and is deemed an obligatory part of the "Couleur" or "uniform" of Corps members. Depending on the time of year, one of two styles of headgear may be chosen by "Aktive" or active members. In the winter academic semester, a black cap, sporting thin bands of black, white and yellow must be worn.

In the summer semester, a white silk "Stürmer" or Kepi with black, white and yellow piping may be worn. According to the constitution of Corps Austria, the "Stürmer" may only be worn if a meeting of the internal council or "Corps Convent", elects to wear the "Stürmer" for that summer semester. Furthermore, a "Kneipjacke" or mess jacket may be worn on specific occasions. This jacket is black in colour and features silver and black braiding. "Füchse", initiate applicants to the Corps are allowed to wear a two-coloured sash of black and yellow. This is in contrast to the three-coloured sash of fully-fledged members or corps brothers (CB's). Lastly, as with all such student fraternities, Corps Austria employs its own Motto, "Durch Eintracht Stark!" or "Strength Through Unity!"

History

Out of fear of the liberal and enlightened ideals of the French Revolution, the Reichstag of the Holy Roman Empire in Regensburg in 1793 proscribed all student associations. However this ban would be strictly enforced only in the territory of the Habsburg Empire and then in large part thanks to the zeal of the suppressive Metternich régime. Even correspondence with foreign universities would be forbidden to students. After a brief period of respite in the aftermath of the so-called "March Revolution" of 1848, student associations were once more forbidden in 1849. 
 
It was not until 1859, that the situation had sufficiently mellowed to allow the establishment of such student bodies of the same model as were to be found in other German-speaking states. The cause of this change can be attributed both to the overwhelming defeat of the Habsburg Empire in the Battle of Solferino and the resultant dire state of the Empire's finances. In order to carry out much needed reforms to address these issues, Emperor Franz Joseph I required the support of the middle-classes, who tended to embrace liberal ideals.
 
Whilst the question of national identity did not arise concerning students in other German-speaking territories, the question of students' national identity did however arise in the context of the multi-national Habsburg Empire. The Czechs, for example, regarded the particular form of German student association as was introduced to Prague to be "typically German", whilst the Austrians increasingly believed their student associations to be almost an extension of their national identity. Consequently, such student bodies with their colourful nationalist paraphernalia frequently drew the wrath of the native population upon themselves.

Origins of Corps Austria

Corps Austria was founded on 23 February 1861 by students of the Karl-Ferdinand University in Prague. On 28 June 1881, an event occurred that would lead to the eventual displacement of the Corps from its birthplace. In the so-called "Battle of Kuchelbad", a popular destination on the outskirts of Prague, Czech students violently overwhelmed and routed the participants of the annual celebrations (Ger. "Stiftungsfest") commemorating the founding of the Corps.

With this fracas, an unfortunate precedent had been set. Although it was never officially recognised as such, the Battle of Kuchelbad had in fact opened the door on an animosity between the various nationalities of the Austro-Hungarian Empire. The Badeni Language Act of 5 April 1897 attempted to lessen the growing divide between the native Czechs and their German-speaking overlords by giving equal importance to the German and Czech languages in the context of rulings in courts of law in Bohemia and Moravia. A storm of protests by German-speakers engulfed cities across the Empire such that the act was entirely repealed by 1899. A chain of events that would lead to the collapse of the Empire in the First World War had now gained an unstoppable momentum.

After World War I, a reconstitution of the Corps in Prague was deemed inadvisable not least because the colours of the Corps reflected the colours of the old Habsburg Monarchy. Instead the Corps quit Prague indefinitely and moved home, once in 1919 to Innsbruck in Austria, as guests of Corps Rhaetia Innsbruck and then in the same year to the newly founded Johann Wolfgang Goethe University in Frankfurt am Main, where it has been ever since.

In 1935, the National Socialist government passed a law requiring all student bodies to expel members, whom it deemed to be "non-aryan". Corps Austria refused to comply and accordingly was forced to close its doors in 1936. In 1939, the Corp's association of Old Boys (Alte Herren Verein) was forcibly disbanded by the Gestapo largely because it refused to co-operate with the association of the National Socialist German Students' League (NS-Studentenbund). After World War II, in which 19 members of the Corps lost their lives, Corps Austria was reconstituted in Frankfurt in 1949.

General 
Corp Austria has been a member of the Kösener Senioren-Convents-Verband (KSCV) since 1919. On the basis of its principles and values (e.g. personal etiquette and decorum), Corps Austria is deemed to belong to the "Blue Circle", an unofficial circle within the KSCV Kösener Senioren-Convents-Verband of Corps with similar values, on which basis alliances and friendships are formed „Blauer Kreis“.

Famous members 

Vincenz Czerny (1842–1916), surgeon
Robert Gersuny (1844–1924), surgeon
Jürgen Herrlein (born 1962), lawyer
Ott-Heinrich Keller (1906–1990), mathematician
Josef Neuwirth, art historian
Alfred Pribram (1841–1912), internist
Richard Pribram, Austrian chemist
August Leopold von Reuss (1841–1924), ophthalmologist
Karl Hans Strobl (1877–1946), novelist
Eberhard Zahn (1910–2010)
Anton Tausche, Bohemian teacher

Literature 

Jürgen Herrlein, Corps Austria – Corpsgeschichte 1861-2001 (History of Corps Austria 1861-2001), Frankfurt am Main 2003
Jürgen Herrlein, Corps Austria - Corpsliste 1861-2001 (List of members 1861-2001), Frankfurt am Main 2001
Egon Erwin Kisch, Alt-Prager Mensurlokale, in Aus Prager Gassen und Nächten (collected works, volume 2), Aufbau Verlag, Berlin, 5. edition  1992, S. 172-176
Egon Erwin Kisch, Die Kuchelbader Schlacht, in Prager Pitaval - Späte Reportagen (collected works, volume 3), Aufbau Verlag, Berlin, 5. edition 1992, S. 267-271

External links
 Literature about Corps Austria in the catalogues of the German National Library
 Corps Austria (in German)

Austria
1861 establishments in Germany
Student organizations established in 1861
Organisations based in Frankfurt
Goethe University Frankfurt alumni